Meade House may refer to:

Ward-Meade House, Topeka, Kansas, listed on the NRHP in Shawnee County
Sunny Meade, Jennings, Louisiana, listed on the NRHP in Jefferson Davis Parish
Judge C. D. Meade House, Pierre, South Dakota, listed on the NRHP in Hughes County
Belle Meade Plantation, Nashville, Tennessee, a plantation house in Davidson County
West Meade, Nashville, Tennessee, listed on the NRHP in Davidson County
Woods-Meade House, Rocky Mount, Virginia, listed on the NRHP in Franklin County
Capt. Matthew J. Meade House, Kaukauna, Wisconsin, listed on the NRHP in Outagamie County

See also
Mead House (disambiguation)